Nardoichthys francisci is an extinct species of perciform fish from the Campanian / Maastrichtian epoch of Nardò, Italy.

References 

Prehistoric perciform genera
Cretaceous bony fish
Late Cretaceous fish
Fossils of Italy
Fossil taxa described in 1991